The Norfolk Admirals are a professional ice hockey team in the ECHL that began play in the 2015–16 season.  Based in Norfolk, Virginia, the team plays its home games at the Norfolk Scope. The Admirals replaced the American Hockey League team of the same name, which played from 2000 until 2015, after which they moved to San Diego, California, and became the current incarnation of the San Diego Gulls.

History

On January 29, 2015, the Anaheim Ducks announced that they would be moving their AHL affiliate, the Norfolk Admirals, to San Diego as one of five charter members of the AHL's new Pacific Division.  The next day, the Edmonton Oilers announced that their outgoing ECHL team, the Bakersfield Condors (who would also be supplanted by a new Bakersfield Condors in the AHL), would move to Norfolk and take on the Admirals name and logo. The Oilers Entertainment Group had originally purchased the ECHL Condors in January 2014, one year prior to the announcement of the relocation.

Admirals hockey in Norfolk actually began in the ECHL, where the Hampton Roads Admirals played from 1989 until 2000, when the ownership group purchased an AHL franchise license, changed the name to the Norfolk Admirals, and began play as an AHL expansion team starting with the 2000–01 season. The original ECHL Admirals' run was very successful, winning three titles – the Riley Cup in 1991 and 1992 and the Kelly Cup in 1998, an ECHL record which has since been tied by the Alaska Aces and the South Carolina Stingrays.

After one season, the Oilers announced they had sold the Admirals franchise to the Mango Media Group. The Admirals continued the Oilers affiliation under the new ownership for the rest of the 2016–17 season. In 2017–18, the Admirals left the Oilers' organization and affiliated with the Nashville Predators. On June 1, 2017, the Admirals revealed their new logo, which is similar to the logo of the original Admirals ECHL team and had similar colors to their new NHL affiliate. However, on November 28, 2017, the team announced that it has ended its affiliation agreement with the Predators after only 19 games during the 2017–18 season. The Admirals finished the season independent of any official affiliations and failed to make the playoffs for the third straight season.

Prior to the 2018–19 season, the Admirals re-signed head coach Robbie Ftorek on a two-year contract and affiliated with the Arizona Coyotes. Following an average attendance of 2,602 in 2017–18, the lowest recorded attendance in any iteration of the Admirals' history, the Admirals saw increased attendance in its fourth ECHL season to an average of 3,590 in 2018–19.

After the 2018–19 season, former Hampton Roads Admirals' player Patrick Cavanagh led a group that purchased the Admirals from Mango Media Group. Cavanagh then named another Hampton Roads' player Rod Taylor as the head coach, while releasing Ftorek from his contract. The Admirals entered the 2019–20 season as the only ECHL team without an official NHL affiliate and were in last place when the season was curtailed due the COVID-19 pandemic. The team then opted out of participating in the 2020–21 season due to the ongoing restrictions on arena capacity.

On August 27, 2021, the Admirals announced an affiliation agreement with the Carolina Hurricanes for the 2021–22 season.

Season-by-season records

Players

Current roster
As of December 19, 2022.

References

External links
Norfolk Admirals Official Website

Ice hockey teams in Virginia
 
Ice hockey clubs established in 2015
Nashville Predators minor league affiliates
2015 establishments in Virginia
Sports in Norfolk, Virginia
Edmonton Oilers minor league affiliates
Arizona Coyotes minor league affiliates